WSSQ (105.5 FM) – branded as Q105.5 – is a commercial adult contemporary radio station licensed to Sterling, Illinois, United States, serving primarily Whiteside and Lee counties in the Rock River Valley. Owned by Fletcher M. Ford, through licensee Virden Broadcasting Corp., WSSQ serves as the local affiliate for the Chicago Bulls Radio Network. WSSQ also broadcasts Chicago Cubs baseball games.

History
WSSQ launched as WJVM at 94.3 MHz on October 22, 1966; as of 1968, the station was transmitting at 3,000 watts. It was assigned the WSSQ call letters on August 8, 1988. The station was then owned by Seith-Serafin of Sterling, Illiniois, and the station callsign was chosen as an acronym for "Seith Serafin Quality". In July 1993, it was announced that WSSQ and its AM sister station WSDR were sold to LH&S Communications, a company owned by Larry Sales and Howard Murphy which owned radio properties throughout the state of Illinois. In 1998, WSSQ was acquired by Withers Broadcasting.

Effective July 28, 2017, Withers Broadcasting sold WSSQ, WSDR, and WZZT to Fletcher M. Ford's Virden Broadcasting Corp. for $400,000. As of January 24, 2018, WSSQ had a construction permit to change frequency to 105.5 MHz, which took place on June 25, 2018.

Current programming
. In addition to its adult contemporary music format, WSSQ is a member of the Chicago Bulls Radio Network; WSSQ is one of the nearest network affiliates for the Quad Cities region.

Previous logo

References

External links

1966 establishments in Illinois
Mainstream adult contemporary radio stations in the United States
Radio stations established in 1966
SSQ
Whiteside County, Illinois